Darlington Football Club, an English association football club based in Darlington, County Durham, was founded in 1883. They entered the FA Cup for the first time in 1885–86, were founder members of the Northern League in 1889, turned professional in 1908 and joined the North Eastern League, which they won in 1913 and 1921. The latter win preceded election to the Football League as members of its newly formed Third Division North. Runners-up in their first season, Darlington were Northern Section champions three years later, thus winning promotion to the Second Division. Their 15th-place finish in 1926 remains their best League performance, and they were relegated back to the Third Division the following year. After 68 years of continuous membership, they were relegated from the Football League in 1988–89. Having made an immediate return as Conference champions, they remained in the League until 2010, when they again dropped into the Conference. After Darlington failed to exit administration in a manner acceptable to the Football Association, that body treated it as a new club, required it to change its name (to Darlington 1883), and placed its team in the Northern League, the ninth tier of English football, for the 2012–13 season. Five years later, the FA approved the club's request to resume its traditional name.

The club's first team have competed in numerous nationally organised competitions, and all players who have played in between 1 and 24 such matches, either as a member of the starting eleven or as a substitute, are listed below. Each player's details include the duration of his Darlington career, his typical playing position while with the club, and the number of games played and goals scored in domestic league matches and in all senior competitive matches. Where applicable, the list also includes the national team for which the player was selected, and the number of senior international caps he won.

Introduction 

More than 800 men played in nationally organised competition for Darlington but never reached the 25-appearance mark. In the early days, the scarcity of nationally organised competitive football meant players could spend many years with the club while making few such outings. Tommy Waites took part in the club's first FA Cup match in 1885 and made his 14th and last such appearance twelve years later. In between, he represented Durham in inter-county matches, was appointed captain of Darlington F.C. in 1890, and in 1896, was recognised as "one of the most respected and reliable members of the team". Tom Rowlandson, who kept goal in six FA Cup matches, was an amateur international for England, captained a touring Corinthian team that helped spread football worldwide and, as a captain in the Yorkshire Regiment, won the Military Cross before being killed in action during the Somme Offensive in 1916.

Eddie Carr, Len Walker and Simon Davey went on to manage the club's first team. Other players took part in significant matches in the history of the club. Bill Edmunds and John Ward played in Darlington's first match in the Football League, a 2–0 win at home to Halifax Town on 27 August 1921. Seven of the thirteen players used in the club's last match in the league, a 2–0 home defeat against Dagenham & Redbridge on 8 May 2010, fall into this category: Nick Liversedge, Andrew Milne, Dan Burn, Gary Dempsey, Nathan Mulligan, Danny Groves and the 16-year-old Jordan Marshall, who had made his senior debut just eleven days earlier.

Numerous players left Darlington to seek opportunities with other teams. Reg Mountford played for ten years in the First Division for Huddersfield Town, appeared in the 1938 FA Cup Final, and managed the Denmark national team that won the bronze medal at the 1948 Olympics. Ray Wood went on to win two League titles with Manchester United and play for England; he survived the Munich air crash, played another 300 times in the League and managed at both club and international level abroad. The careers of others were winding down: Aston Villa's European Cup-winner Allan Evans's single appearance for Darlington was his last of an 18-year senior career. Others were to make an impression in different sporting fields. Graham Doggart, who played twice for Darlington in 1921–22, became an administrator both in cricket, as a committee member of Sussex CCC and of the MCC, and in football, as chairman of the Football Association. Walter Creasor was a speedway rider in the early days of the sport in Britain.

Key

The list is ordered first by number of appearances in total, then by number of League appearances, and then if necessary by date of debut.
Appearances as a substitute are included.
Statistics are correct up to and including 1 July 2022, the first day of Darlington's 2022–23 season. Where a player left the club permanently after this date, his statistics are updated to his date of leaving.

Players with 1 to 24 appearances

Players with more than 24 appearances

Footnotes

Player statistics include games played while on loan from:

References
Appearances and goals

Specific

Sources
 
 
 
 

Players
 
Darlington
Players
Association football player non-biographical articles